The Corrupt Practices Act 1695 (7 & 8 Will. III, c. 4) was an Act of Parliament of the Parliament of England passed in 1696, the long title of which is "An Act for preventing Charge and Expence in Elections of Members to serve in Parliament." It was intended to counter bribery of the electorate at parliamentary elections, and it established that no candidate was to make any "Gift Reward or Entertainment" to a particular person, or a place in general, in order to be elected to serve in Parliament. This included acts by the candidate themselves, on their behalf, or at their expense, and both direct or indirect activity. Any person found guilty of engaging in, promising, or allowing such behaviour was to be considered incapacitated from serving in Parliament, and would not be allowed to take their seat or vote. To all intents and purposes, this would annul their election as a member.

It was repealed by section 1 of the Corrupt Practices Prevention Act 1854 (c.102).

See also 

 Corrupt practices
 Corrupt Practices Act 1868
 Corrupt and Illegal Practices Prevention Act 1883

References
The Law & Working of the Constitution: Documents 1660-1914, ed. W. C. Costin & J. Steven Watson. A&C Black, 1952. Vol. I (1660-1783), p. 83-4.
'William III, 1695-6: An Act for preventing Charge and Expense in Elections of Members to serve in P[ar]liament. [Chapter IV. Rot. Parl. 7 & 8 Gul. III. P. 1. nu. 4.]', Statutes of the Realm: volume 7: 1695-1701 (1820), pp. 7–8. URL: http://www.british-history.ac.uk/report.asp?compid=46811. Date accessed: 16 February 2007.

1695 in law
1695 in England
Acts of the Parliament of England
Corruption in England
Repealed English legislation